Genista berberidea is a species of broom native to the northwest Iberian Peninsula in southwest Europe.

Description
Inflorescence has 3-5 flowers. Seeds are  diameter, ovoid, dark and bright. 2n = 36.

Distribution and habitat
Genista berberidea is endemic to the northwest of the Iberian Peninsula in Galicia (Spain) and northwest Portugal. It inhabits scrubs in humid places, peatlands and margins of water lines. Often in rainy places and hygro-peat substrates.

References

berberidea
Flora of Southwestern Europe
Flora of Portugal
Flora of Spain